Synapha is a genus of flies belonging to the family Mycetophilidae.

Species:
 Synapha fasciata
 Synapha vitripennis

References

Mycetophilidae